

Squad
As of August 2, 2009

Transfers

In

Out

Statistics

Appearances and goals
Last updated on August 2, 2009.

|}

Note
* = Players who left the club mid-season

Top scorers
Includes all competitive matches

Disciplinary record

Note
* = Players who left the club mid-season

Captains

Penalties Awarded

International players
The following is a list of all squad members who have played for their national sides during the 2008–09 season. Players in bold were in the starting XI for their national side.

14 October 2008

20 January 2009

22 January 2009

24 January 2009

28 January 2009

31 January 2009

2 February 2009

4 February 2009

6 February 2009

8 February 2009

2 April 2009

6 June 2009

11 June 2009

Starting 11

Overall
{|class="wikitable"
|-
|Games played || 50 (35 Primera División Uruguaya, 5 Liguilla Pre-Libertadores, 10 Copa Libertadores)
|-
|Games won || 25 (20 Primera División Uruguaya, 1 Liguilla Pre-Libertadores, 4 Copa Libertadores)
|-
|Games drawn || 14 (9 Primera División Uruguaya, 1 Liguilla Pre-Libertadores, 4 Copa Libertadores)
|-
|Games lost || 11 (6 Primera División Uruguaya, 3 Liguilla Pre-Libertadores, 2 Copa Libertadores)
|-
|Goals scored || 83
|-
|Goals conceded || 58
|-
|Goal difference || +25
|-
|Yellow cards || 115
|-
|Red cards || 15
|-
|Worst discipline ||  Santiago García (6 , 3 )
|-
|Best result ||  3-0 (A) v  Nacional - Copa Libertadores 2009.02.134-1 (A) v Racing - Primera División Uruguaya 2009.03.143-0 (H) v  River Plate - Copa Libertadores 2009.03.193-0 (N) v Defensor Sporting - Primera División Uruguaya 2009.07.08
|-
|Worst result || 0-3 (H) v Central Español - Primera División Uruguaya 2009.06.13
|-
|Most appearances ||  Santiago García (42 appearances)
|-
|Top scorer ||  Santiago García (13 goals)
|-

Club

Coaching staff

Friendlies

Copa Bimbo

Semi-finals

Final

Primera División Uruguaya

Apertura's table

The apertura's winner qualifies for the semifinal of the Primera División

Matches

Final

Clausura's table

Villa Española was relegated due to financial issues after the Apertura.

The clausura's winner qualifies for the semifinal of the Primera División

Matches

Aggregate table

The aggregate's winners qualify to Primera División Uruguaya final
The aggregate's top-six qualify to Liguilla Pre-Libertadores

Results by round

Relegation table

As of June 18, 2009.
The three clubs with the lowest average of points over the last two seasons are relegated.

Semi-finals

First leg

Second leg

Third legNacional won 5–2 on points.Final

First leg

Second legNacional won 6–0 on points.Copa Libertadores

Group stage

Round of 16

First  leg

Second legSan Luis withdrew from the tournament over the H1N1 flu outbreak in MexicoQuarterfinals

First leg

Second legNacional 1–1 Palmeiras on aggregate. Nacional won on away goals.Semi-finals

First leg

Second legEstudiantes won 3–1 on aggregate.Liguilla Pre-Libertadores

The Liguilla Pre-Libertadores' champion qualify to Copa Libertadores 2010 group stage
The Liguilla Pre-Libertadores' runners-up qualify to Copa Libertadores 2010 preliminary round
The Liguilla Pre-Libertadores' third and fourth place qualify to Copa Sudamericana 2009 first stage
If Nacional finish in the top-four qualify to Copa Sudamericana 2009 first stage

Matches

Records

Doubles achieved

Comeback
Nacional have conceded the first goal in a match 17 times this season in the Primera División, the Liguille Pre-Libertadores and the Copa Libertadores,  recorded 4 wins, 5 draws and 8 loss.
{| class="wikitable"
|-
!Opponent
!H/A
!Result
!Scoreline
|-
|Danubio
|align=center|N
|align=center|2–1
|S. Rodríguez 36,  Fernández 60',  S. García 77'
|-
|Racing
|align=center|A
|align=center|4–1
|''Blanes 36,  Fernández 57',  Domínguez 60',  Medina 90',  90+4'
|-
|Defensor Sporting
|align=center|A
|align=center|2–1
|Pintos 66''',  Coates 68',  Biscayzacú 86'
|-
|Nacional (Paraguay)
|align=center|H
|align=center|3–1
|Núñez 9,  Arismendi 29',  Coates 80',  Lodeiro 90+1'
|}

Biggest winning margin

Team statistics

Goal minutes
Updated to games played on 2 August 2009.

Honours

TeamTorneo Apertura Winners: 2008Primera División Uruguaya'''
 Winners: 2008–09

Individuals

See also
 Club Nacional de Football

External links
 Club Nacional de Football official web site

Club Nacional de Football seasons